Giuseppe Beltrami (17 January 1889 – 13 December 1973) was an Italian cardinal of the Roman Catholic Church who served as internuncio to the Netherlands from 1959 to 1967, and was elevated to the cardinalate in 1967.

Biography

Born in Fossano, Giuseppe Beltrami attended the seminary in Fossano before being ordained to the priesthood on 5 March 1916. He served as a chaplain in the Italian Army during World War I (1916–1919), and then studied until 1923 at the Pontifical Roman Athenaeum S. Apollinare, from where he obtained his doctorates in theology and in canon law, and the Royal University, earning a doctorate in letters.

From 1923 to 1926, Beltrami was a staff member of the Vatican Library. He was raised to the rank of an honorary chamberlain of his holiness on 14 July 1924 and became an official of the Secretariat of State in 1926. Monsignor Beltrami then served as a lawyer for the causes of canonization and beatification in the Sacred Congregation of Rites until 1940, also being named a privy chamberlain of his holiness on 9 July 1926.

On 20 February 1940, Beltrami was appointed Apostolic Nuncio to Guatemala and El Salvador and titular archbishop of Damascus. He received his episcopal consecration on the following 7 April from Cardinal Luigi Maglione, with Archbishop Gabriele Vettori and Bishop Angelo Soracco serving as co-consecrators, in the church of San Carlo al Corso.

Beltrami was named Nuncio to Colombia on 15 November 1945; during his tenure there, he served as the papal legate to the National Eucharistic Congress in Bogotá on 29 June 1946. During his tenure, Tulio Botero Salazar was appointed private secretary of the nunciature. The Archbishop worked as a nuncio at the disposition of Secretariat of State from 1948 to 1950, when he was assigned as Nuncio to Lebanon on 4 October. Beltrami was appointed internuncio to the Netherlands on 31 January 1959 and faced much theological dissidence in the usually progressive country. The Dutch Catholic clergy once complained that Beltrami "kept the wires to Rome hot with reports of heresy in Holland".

He attended the Second Vatican Council from 1962 to 1965. Pope Paul VI created him Cardinal Priest of S. Maria Liberatrice al Monte Testaccio in the consistory of 26 June 1967. The appointment of the successor to Beltrami's  diplomatic post in the Netherlands was published on 22 July 1967. He lost the right to participate in a papal conclave upon reaching the age of 80 on 1 January 1971.

The Cardinal died in Rome, at age 84. He is buried in the cathedral of his native Fossano.

References

External links
Catholic-Hierarchy
Cardinals of the Holy Roman Church

1889 births
1973 deaths
People from Fossano
20th-century Italian cardinals
Participants in the Second Vatican Council
Cardinals created by Pope Paul VI
Italian military chaplains
Royal Italian Army chaplains
Apostolic Nuncios to Lebanon
Apostolic Nuncios to Guatemala
Apostolic Nuncios to El Salvador
Apostolic Nuncios to the Netherlands
Apostolic Nuncios to Colombia